Jan van den Aveele or Aveelen  (Leiden , Dutch Republic,  1650 - Stockholm, Sweden, 18 May 1727) was a Dutch etcher and copper engraver.

With compatriot Willem Swidde, he  made engravings for Suecia Antiqua et Hodierna ("Ancient and Modern Sweden") including depictions of public buildings and city scapes in Stockholm and other Swedish cities.

References

1650s births
1729 deaths
Swedish artists
Artists from Leiden